Duliskan-e Olya (also Romanized as Dūlīskān-e ‘Olyā; also known as Dhūlīs Khān, Doliskan, Dowlīsgān, Dowlīskān, and Dūlīsgān) is a village in Qaedrahmat Rural District, Zagheh District, Khorramabad County, Lorestan Province, Iran. At the 2006 census, its population was 255, in 44 families.

References 

Towns and villages in Khorramabad County